Several ships have been named :

Sunk by a typhoon in 1945.
 , a class of 2 Japanese battleships and an aircraft carrier of World War II
 , lead ship of the Yamato class, named after Yamato Province
 Yamato Maru, originally the  that was built in 1914 and transported thousands of Italians to Ellis Island; sold to the Japanese in the 1920s and renamed Yamato Maru, sunk by a US submarine in 1943 in the Philippines
 Yamato 1, the first working prototype of a ship with a magnetohydrodynamic drive in the early 1990s

Fictional
 Space Battleship Yamato
 Superbattleship Yamato

See also
 Space Battleship Yamato (disambiguation)
 Yamato (disambiguation)
 List of ships named Musashi